The  National Day of Mourning is an annual demonstration, held on the fourth Thursday in November, that aims to educate the public about Native Americans in the United States, notably the Wampanoag and other tribes of the Eastern United States; dispel myths surrounding the Thanksgiving story in the United States; and raise awareness toward historical and ongoing struggles facing Native American tribes. The first National Day of Mourning demonstration was held in 1970 after Frank "Wamsutta" James's speaking invitation was rescinded from a Massachusetts Thanksgiving Day celebration commemorating the 350th anniversary of the landing of the Mayflower. James instead delivered his speech on Cole's Hill in Plymouth, Massachusetts next to a statue of Ousamequin, where he described Native American perspectives on the Thanksgiving celebrations. The gathering became an annual event organized by the United American Indians of New England (UAINE) and coincides with both Thanksgiving Day in the United States and with Unthanksgiving Day, an annual ceremony held on Alcatraz Island in California.

History

Frank "Wamsutta" James' speech cancelled
In the fall of 1970, the Commonwealth of Massachusetts held a commemorative Thanksgiving celebration on the 350th anniversary of the first landing of the Mayflower. The event's organizers, including Governor Francis Sargent, invited Frank "Wamsutta" James to speak at the event. James was the leader of the Wampanoag Tribe of Gay Head and president of the Federated Eastern Indian League. 

The event's organizers requested to review James' speech in advance of the event. Once it had been reviewed, James was informed that he would not be permitted to give the speech as written. An alternate speech, written by the event's public relations team, was provided to him. A representative from the Department of Commerce and Development explained to James that

Initial event
Wamsutta Frank James, Tall Oak Weeden, Gary Parker, Shirley Mills, Rayleen Bey, and several other people organized speakers, recruited attendees on a national scale, and arranged accommodations for out-of-town guests.

The first National Day of Mourning event was held on Thanksgiving Day, November 26, 1970 on Cole's Hill in Plymouth, Massachusetts. James delivered an amended speech beside a statue of Ousamequin, including

The event was attended by close to 500 Native Americans from throughout the United States and has been held annually on the fourth Thursday in November every year since. James' speech was one of the first public criticisms of the Thanksgiving story from Native American groups.

Later protests
The United American Indians of New England (UAINE) continues to organize the annual National Day of Mourning rally at Cole's Hill. The event's objectives include
 Education around the history of the Wampanoag people
 Dispelling of the mythology commonly taught as part of the Thanksgiving story
 Awareness of historical and ongoing struggles of Native American tribes

Controversy 1995–97
At the 1995 event, protestors dumped sand and seaweed on Plymouth Rock as part of the demonstration. In 1997, police attacked peaceful National Day of Mourning marchers, which included the use of pepper spray. 25 marchers were arrested and charged with misdemeanor as well as felony crimes. Plymouth agreed to drop the charges in a 1998 settlement with UAINE.

Modern commemoration

The National Day of Mourning protest is held annually at Cole's Hill and is attended by several hundred participants. Estimates of attendance in 2021 range from 1,000 – 2,000.  Frank James' son Roland Moonanum James continued to be involved in the event until his death in December 2020, and Frank's granddaughter Kisha James helps organize it in her role as UAINE youth coordinator. Mahtowin Munro has been co-leader since the 1990s. 

During the COVID-19 pandemic, the rally was held both in-person and virtually, and over 1600 people tuned in to the livestream and more than 20,000 to the online video.

References

Further reading
 "Frank James (Wamsutta, 1923–2001) National Day of Mourning," in Dawnland Voices: An Anthology of Indigenous Writing from New England edited by Siobhan Senior (Lincoln: University of Nebraska Press, 2014), 455–458.

External links
 United American Indians of New England: Official site
 Full text of Frank Wamsutta James' 1970 speech
 SmokeSygnals National Day of Mourning informational video
 Photos: National Day of Mourning 2022

Public holidays in the United States
Indigenous rights protests
Observances based on the date of Thanksgiving (United States)
Native American genocide
Annual protests
Thursday observances